Sea Scouts are a part of the  Scout movement, with a particular emphasis on boating and other water-based activities on the sea, rivers or lakes (canoeing, rafting, scuba, sailboarding). Sea Scouts can provide a chance to sail, cruise on boats, learn navigation, learn how to work on engines and compete in regattas. Sea Scouts often have distinctive uniforms. In some countries or Scout organizations, Sea Scouting is a program just for older Scouts.

History

One of the earliest records of  "Sea Scouts" is in Chums magazine which refers to "Sea Scouts" as early as July 1909. These Sea Scouts were part of the Chums Scouts and British Boy Scouts. 

Also in the Chums magazine, the British Boys Naval Brigade, later National Naval Cadets, were subtitled 'Scouts of the Sea' from the 14 July 1909 edition and, from the 28 July 1909 edition, 'Sea Scouts of the Empire'. The British Boy Scouts and an original company of The National Naval Cadets were both headquartered in Battersea, London and the 'boys' weekly newspaper Chums was the official journal of both. The National Naval Cadets affiliated with the British Boy Scouts as part of its Sea Scouts.

Later, Sea Scouts were introduced within the Baden-Powell Boy Scouts organization. In the first edition of Scouting for Boys, Baden-Powell mentioned that "A Scout should be able to manage a boat, to bring it properly alongside a ship or pier....". In December 1908, the first Seamanship badge was issued as one of the first 'Efficiency' badges. A camp for Scouts was held at Bucklers Hard, Hampshire in August 1909 at which boating activities were a focus. In 1911, Baden-Powell wrote the booklet Sea Scouting for Boys. Warington Baden-Powell wrote Sea Scouting and Seamanship for Boys in 1912, with a foreword by Robert Baden-Powell. A special uniform for Sea Scouts was approved in 1910 and, in 1912, the name "Sea Scouts" was officially adopted within Baden-Powell's Boy Scouts Association.

Sea Scouting found its way to the rest of the world. In many organizations a Sea Scout troop or group has a special name, in the Boy Scouts of America it is called a ship.

Around the world

Eurosea seminars

Eurosea is the seminar for Sea Scouting/Guiding in the European Scout Region which take place every two or three years. The aims and objectives are to enable national associations to share ideas and experiences on how to develop Sea Scouting/Guiding or water-based programs in general.
Participants are members of national or regional teams responsible for Sea Scouting/Guiding or developing water-based programs and representatives from associations interested in introducing Sea Scouting/Guiding.
Eurosea 1, 1985: Thessaloniki, Greece
Eurosea 2, 1988: Harderhaven, Netherlands
Eurosea 3, 1992: Vässarö, Sweden
Eurosea 4, 1994: London, United Kingdom
Eurosea 5, 1997: Oslo, Norway
Eurosea 6, 2000: Olsztynek, Poland
Eurosea 7, 2003: São Jacinto, Aveiro, Portugal
Eurosea 8, 2006: Korpo, Finland
Eurosea 9, 2008: Larch Hill, Ireland
Eurosea 10, 2010: Plzeň, Czech Republic
Eurosea 11, 2012: Copenhagen, Denmark
Eurosea 12, 2014: Bruges, Belgium
Eurosea 13, 2016: Puck, Poland
Eurosea 14, 2018: Barcelona, Spain
Eurosea 15, 2022: Athens, Greece

Loss of vessels
4 August 1912 – eight Boy Scouts from the 2nd Walworth (Dulwich Mission) group and another boy drowned in capsize of a cutter off Leysdown, Kent, England. The boat was carrying twenty-three Scouts from Erith to a camp at Leysdown.
27 October 1913 – three Scouts and an assistant leader drowned and eleven Scouts were saved when the ketch Mirror was hit by the steamer Hogarth (1231 tons) while tacking across the river. Mirror had been a gift of the Daily Mirror newspaper to the Scouts.
In August 1950 – all ten Scouts on board were killed when the Wangle III, owned by 1st Mortlake Sea Scouts was lost on a return voyage from France.

See also
S.S.S. Lotus

References

Further reading

External links

Scouting
Water sports
Boating associations
Maritime culture